Ivan Mavrodi (5 August 1911, Katarzhino1981, Odessa) was a Bulgarian-Ukrainian Soviet writer and poet.

Ivan Mavrodi was born in the largely Bulgarian village of Katarzhino (Катаржино), now Znamianka (Знам'янка), Odessa Oblast, Ukraine, to a family of Bulgarian resettlers to the Russian Empire. In 1935 he graduated from Odessa Pedagogical Institute and worked as teacher in rural schools. During the Great Patriotic War he joined the active service in the Soviet Army.

His first publications are dated by 1932.

Works

Books
In Bulgarian language, by the National Minorities Publishing House, Kharkiv, Ukraine:
1932: «Партизани. И други разкази»
1934: «На пълен ход»
1941: «Дочо Цигуларов»
In Russian language:
1955: «Радость»
1956: «Первые всходы»
1961: «У нас на юге»
1977: «Буджакские повести»

Poetry
He wrote poems in the Bulgarian language throughout his whole life, but was unable to find a publisher in the Ukrainian SSR. In 1972 the Moldavian Soviet publisher Cartea Moldovenească, Chişinău, printed his collection of poems «За тебе аз мисля» (I am Thinking about You).

References

Soviet military personnel of World War II
Soviet male poets
Soviet poets
20th-century male writers
20th-century Ukrainian poets
20th-century Bulgarian poets
Bulgarian male poets
1911 births
1981 deaths
Ukrainian writers
Bulgarian writers
Ukrainian male poets